Allan Julien Dokossi (born 14 October 1999) is a French-Central African professional basketball player for Fos Provence Basket of the LNB Pro A.

Club career
During the 2018–19 season, Allan Dokossi played for Fos Provence Basket as part of its LNB Pro A under-21 team. There, he averaged around 14 points and 11 rebounds. These numbers guaranteed him his first games for the club's first team.

At the start of the 2020-21 LNB Pro B season, management at Fos Provence Basket was not certain whether Dokossi would make its prime squad. Hence, they equipped him with a double license with the Sorgues-Avignon club of the Nationale 1 where he played two games before returning to his main team. As of late December 2020, Dokossi averaged 8 points and 6.7 rebounds in three LNB Pro B league games, and 11 points and 7.9 rebounds in seven LNB Pro A Leaders Cup matches.

National team
Dokossi has been a member of the Central African Republic national basketball team.

Player profile
Dokossi is left handed and plays both Forward positions. (Small forward and Power forward). His team's general manager and former player Julien Monclar stated that he values Dokossi's athleticism. In early 2021, his team's head coach Rémi Giuitta added that Dokossi impresses through his rebounding, defense and self-discipline.

References

External links
FIBA profile
Profile at Eurobasket.com
Profile at Basketball-Reference.com

1999 births
Living people
Citizens of the Central African Republic through descent
Central African Republic men's basketball players
Forwards (basketball)
Basketball players from Paris
French men's basketball players
Fos Provence Basket players
Black French sportspeople
French sportspeople of Central African Republic descent